Ocucajea is an extinct genus of basilosaurid cetacean from Middle Eocene (Bartonian stage) deposits of southern Peru. Ocucajea is known from the holotype MUSM 1442, a partial skeleton.

The genus was named after the town Ocucaje in the Ica Province near the type locality, and the species after José Luis Pickling Zolezzi, naturalist, artist, and an important contributor to Peruvian palaeontology.

Ocucajea is smaller than all other dorudontines.  It differs from Saghacetus and Dorudon in cranial morphology; in Ocucajea the nasals extends farther posteriorly than the maxillae, and there is no narial process of the frontal like in Saghacetus.

References

Bibliography 
 

Basilosauridae
Prehistoric cetacean genera
Eocene mammals of South America
Divisaderan
Paleogene Peru
Fossils of Peru
Fossil taxa described in 2011